Adeva (born Patricia Daniels) is an American singer. She had a string of successful house and R&B hits in the late 1980s to early 1990s, including "Warning!", "I Thank You" and "Respect" (all three of which reached number 17 in the UK Singles Chart).

Early life
Born in 1960 in Paterson, New Jersey, Daniels was the youngest of six children. She developed her voice as a member, and later director and vocal coach, of her church choir. She began singing professionally in the mid-1980s, releasing the single "In and Out of My Life" in 1988 on Easy Street Records.

Debut album
Immediately after this, she signed with the UK label Cooltempo (a subsidiary of EMI) later in 1988 and released a house reworking of the Aretha Franklin hit "Respect" that reached #17 in the UK. Her debut album Adeva! was released in August 1989, and peaked at #6 on the UK Albums Chart, #28 in Germany, and #14 in Australia. The album was certified platinum by the British Phonographic Industry for UK sales exceeding 300,000 copies. In addition to "Respect", the album contained several other hit singles including "Warning!" and "I Thank You", both of which also reached #17 in the UK, and "Musical Freedom" which reached #22. The album was released in the United States in 1990 via EMI's Capitol Records, where "Warning!" had become a top 10 Billboard Dance Chart hit.

Later career
Her second album, 1991's Love or Lust? failed to chart in both the UK and US, despite featuring two hit singles on the US Dance chart, "Independent Woman" (US Dance #7) and "It Should Have Been Me" (US Dance #1), and she was dropped by Cooltempo in 1992.

Adeva collaborated with house music pioneer Frankie Knuckles in 1995, with whom she released two UK top 40 singles and an album, Welcome to the Real World.

In 1997, Adeva released another album, New Direction, on Distinct'ive Records, but this was unsuccessful. It is her last album to date, though she was featured on various singles in 2003–04 with other artists, including Radical Noiz and Eric Prydz who both sampled Adeva's 1988 single "In and Out of My Life", which was also sampled by OnePhatDeeva in 1999. She was also featured on the 2004 single "Wish I Never Knew" by the Scandinavian dance act, Slippery People.

Discography

Studio albums

Compilation albums

Singles

Collaborations

Videos
 1991 Live at the Town and Country Club, Chrysalis/EMI Video (UK)
 1992 The Video Hits!

See also
 List of Billboard number-one dance club songs
 List of artists who reached number one on the U.S. Dance Club Songs chart

References

External links
 Allmusic.com: Adeva

1960 births
American dance musicians
American electronic musicians
American women singers
American house musicians
Living people
American contemporary R&B singers
American garage house musicians
Capitol Records artists
Chrysalis Records artists
Parlophone artists
Musicians from Paterson, New Jersey
Singers from New Jersey
American women in electronic music
21st-century American women